Neugrund breccia is a type of rock consisting of gneissic breccia and amphibolite originating from the Neugrund crater. Neugrund breccia is different from Ordovician breccia, which is found in a similar region but was formed millions of years later after a different meteor strike.

Neugrund breccia formed during the cementation of meteor fragments. Glacial action distributed erratics of breccia throughout an area of over 10,000 km2 surrounding the impact site. Boulders of Neugrund breccia can be found in north-western Estonia and are especially concentrated around the island of Osmussaar.

The largest known Neugrund breccia formation is Skarvan. It is located near the west coast of Osmussaar.

References

Breccias